Florida Amendment 1, whose full title is Rights of Electricity Consumers Regarding Solar Energy Choice, Amendment 1, is a 2016 constitutional amendment on solar energy in the U.S. state of Florida.  It is supported by Consumers for Smart Solar and opposed by Floridians for Solar Choice. The amendment has been called misleading by opponents.

Results

References

External links
Amendment text and history at Florida Department of State
Amendment 1 (2016) at Ballotpedia

Proposed laws of the United States
Amendment 1
Florida Amendment 1
Florida ballot measures